—meaning technique, method, spell, skill or trick—is a bound morpheme of the Sino-Japanese lexical stratum of the Japanese language. It is used in various Japanese terms indicating various specialties or skills, such as the following:

 Bajutsu, the skills of horse riding
 
 Bōjutsu, fighting with a staff or elongated blunt object
 Brazilian jiu-jitsu, the practice of self-defense
 Daitō-ryū Aiki-jūjutsu, the art of close combat
 Hōjutsu, use of firearms from close range
 Iaijutsu, the sword technique of a sudden mortal draw attack
 Jittejutsu, the Japanese martial art of using the Japanese weapon jitte
 
 Kamajutsu, defense and combat with metal sickles (kama)
 Kenjutsu, the art of sword fighting
 Kusarigamajutsu, fighting with kusarigama
 Kayakujutsu, Art of gunpowder
 Kyujutsu, the art of the bow
 Naginatajutsu, the art of using a naginata
 Ninjutsu, Shinobi combat techniques and practices
 , fighting with sai daggers
 Shurikenjutsu, the practice of throwing blades
 Sōjutsu, the practice of using a spear
 Taihen-jutsu, Art of Silent movement, leaping, falling, rolling and tumbling
 Taijutsu, unarmed fighting style
 Tantojutsu, the technique of using a small blade or dagger
 Tessenjutsu, fighting with the deceptive metal fan
 Tonfajutsu, fighting with blunt tonfa weapons
 Genjutsu, art of illusion
 Majutsu, art of witchcraft

Other uses 
 Jutsu (Naruto), a fictional type of magical attack performed by ninjas in the manga and anime series Naruto

See also 
 The Jitsu Foundation